Chunchi may refer to:

 Chunchi Canton, Chimborazo Province, Ecuador
 Chunchi, Ecuador, town in and seat of Chunchi Canton
 Chunchi, Zhouning County (纯池镇), town in Zhouning County, Fujian, China